Lendelede is a municipality located in the Belgian province of West Flanders. The municipality comprises only the town of Lendelede proper. On January 1, 2006, Lendelede had a total population of 5,399. The total area is 13.15 km2 which gives a population density of 411 inhabitants per km2.

People from Lendelede
 
 Achille Delaere
 Jan Kuyckx

Gallery

References

External links 
 
  

Municipalities of West Flanders